Call Girl is a 1974 Bollywood romantic drama film directed by Vijay Kapoor.

Plot

Amar returns from abroad and is asked by his multi-millionaire father, Sonachand, to assist with their family business; Amar agrees to do so, on the condition that he could spend the rest of the evening and night doing what he likes - painting.

He meets with a beautiful young woman by the name of Kamini, who at first does not disclose her name to him because she is a call girl.

However, Amar names her Maya and falls in love with her. When he attempts to introduce her to his parents, on reaching his house his mother accepts her, but there she sees his father's (Sonachand's) photo and she recalls that he is the same person who had forced her into prostitution by promising her a job.

He'd had an intimate relationship with her years ago and threatened her to get into this business, or else he would kidnap her sister who studies in a boarding school in Panchgani and throw her into this business.

But now, Kamini/Maya has decided to leave this profession. But Sonachand does not want Amar to marry a call girl. So he tells Kamini to act like a call girl once again so that Amar leaves her. Kamini agrees to do so, because she doesn't want Amar to face problems from society as well as his family.

But on the same night, Sonachand sees that his own daughter Usha has taken to prostitution. Meanwhile, Amar learns the truth about his father and shuns him.

His father shoots himself because of his guilt and Amar leaves his house to go to find Kamini, and sees that she has consumed slow poison and is about to die within a few hours. So Amar quickly uses her services as a call girl and pays her for a one-night stand before she dies.

Cast
 Vikram ...Amar 
 Zaheera ...Maya / Kamini 
 Iftekhar ...Sonachand 
 Helen ...Sylvia 
 Jalal Agha   
 Paintal ...Ramesh 
 Urmila Bhatt ...Mrs. Sonachand 
 Keshto Mukherjee   
 Jankidas ...Tikamchand 
 Shefali ...Usha
 Hina Kausar
Music Director: Sapan-Jagmohan

Music
 "Ulfat Men Zamaane Ki" - Kishore Kumar, Lata Mangeshkar
 "Ulfut Me Zamane Ki (Female)" - Lata Mangeshkar
 "Hum Hai Jaha Wo Pyar Ki Mahki" - Kishore Kumar, Asha Bhosle
 "Jawaani Mera Yaara Na Aayegi Dobara" - Ranu Mukherjee, Kishore Kumar
 "Dil Jale To Koi Kya Kare" - Asha Bhosle
 "I Am Call Girl" - Ranu Mukherjee

External links
 

1974 films
1970s Hindi-language films
1974 romantic drama films
Films about prostitution in India
Indian romantic drama films